The University of California, Berkeley Department of History is an academic department located in Berkeley, CA. The history department offers bachelor's degrees, master's degrees, and doctorate degrees in history and is one of the largest at the UC Berkeley College of Letters and Science. According to the U.S. News & World Report rankings in history, the department is #1 in the nation, ahead of Princeton University, Yale University, University of Michigan, and Stanford University.

Academics
The department of history is one of the largest in the College of Letters and Science.

The undergraduate program provides students a B.A. in History upon completion of lower- and upper-division requirements. Students are also able to join Phi Alpha Theta, the history honors society, or contribute to Clio's Scroll, the undergraduate history journal.

The graduate program in history prepares students for careers in academia, non-profits, government agencies, private sector, and more. Although the department does not offer a terminal master's degree, students may earn one en route to completing a PhD. The department selects about 20 students per year. Students are expected to complete their degree within a seven-year timeframe.

Notably faculty
 Herbert Bolton
 Beshara Doumani
 Erich S. Gruen
 David Hollinger
 Eugene F. Irschick
 Martin Jay
 Adrienne Koch
 Thomas W. Laqueur
 Joseph R. Levenson
 Leon F. Litwack
 Nicholas V. Riasanovsky
 Peter Sahlins
 Raphael Sealey
 Ethan H. Shagan
 Yuri Slezkine
 Kenneth M. Stampp
 Derek Van Rheenen
 Frederic Wakeman
 James Vernon
 Paula S. Fass

External links
Official Website - http://history.berkeley.edu

References

University of California, Berkeley
History departments in the United States